The Cessna 182 Skylane is an American four-seat, single-engined light airplane built by Cessna of Wichita, Kansas. It has the option of adding two child seats in the baggage area.

Introduced in 1956, the 182 has been produced in a number of variants, including a version with retractable landing gear, and is the second-most popular Cessna model still in production after the 172.

Development
The Cessna 182 was introduced in 1956 as a tricycle gear variant of the 180. In 1957, the 182A variant was introduced along with the name Skylane. As production continued, later models were improved regularly with features such as a wider fuselage, swept tailfin with rear "omni-vision" window, enlarged baggage compartment, higher gross weights, landing gear changes, etc.  The "restart" aircraft built after 1996 were different in many other details including a different engine, new seating design, etc.

Cessna has no timeline for the JT-A and the diesel 172. The normally aspirated, avgas-fueled 182 went out of production in 2012, but came back in 2015.

Cessna 182s were also built in Argentina by DINFIA (called A182), and by Reims Aviation, France, as the F182.

Design
The Cessna 182 is an all-metal (mostly aluminum alloy) aircraft, although some parts – such as engine cowling nosebowl and wingtips – are made of fiberglass or thermoplastic material. Its wing has the same planform as the smaller Cessna 172 and the larger 205/206 series; however, some wing details, such as flap and aileron design, are the same as the 172 and are not like the 205/206 components.

Retractable gear

The retractable gear R182 and TR182 were offered from 1978 to 1986, without and with engine turbocharging, respectively. The model designation nomenclature differs from some other Cessna models with optional retractable gear. For instance, the retractable version of the Cessna 172 was designated as the 172RG, whereas the retractable gear version of the Cessna 182 is the R182. Cessna gave the R182 the marketing name of "Skylane RG".

The R182 and TR182 offer 10-15% improvement in climb and cruise speeds over their fixed-gear counterparts, or alternatively, 10-15% better fuel economy at the same speeds at the expense of increased maintenance costs and decreased gear robustness.

The landing-gear retraction system in the Skylane RG uses hydraulic actuators powered by an electrically driven pump. The system includes a gear position warning that emits an intermittent tone through the cabin speaker when the gear is in the retracted position and either the throttle is reduced below about 12 inHg manifold pressure MAP) or the flaps are extended beyond 20°. In the event of a hydraulic pump failure, the landing gear may be lowered using a hand pump to pressurize the hydraulic system. The system does not, however, allow the landing gear to be manually retracted.

Variants
182
Initial production version with fixed landing gear, four-seat light aircraft, powered by a carbureted  Continental O-470-L piston engine, gross weight  and certified on 2 March 1956.
182A Skylane
Four-seat light aircraft with fixed landing gear, powered by a carbureted  Continental O-470-L piston engine, gross weight  and certified on 7 December 1956
182B Skylane
Four-seat light aircraft with fixed landing gear, powered by a carbureted  Continental O-470-L piston engine, gross weight  and certified on 22 August 1958
182C Skylane
Four-seat light aircraft with fixed landing gear, powered by a carbureted  Continental O-470-L] piston engine, gross weight  and certified on 8 July 1959
182D Skylane
Four-seat light aircraft with fixed landing gear, powered by a carbureted  Continental O-470-L piston engine, gross weight  and certified on 14 June 1960
182E Skylane
Four-seat light aircraft with fixed landing gear, powered by a carbureted  Continental O-470-L or O-470-R piston engine, gross weight  and certified on 27 June 1961
182F Skylane
Four-seat light aircraft with fixed landing gear, powered by a carbureted  Continental O-470-L] or O-470-R piston engine, gross weight  and certified on 1 August 1962.
182G Skylane
Four-seat light aircraft with fixed landing gear, powered by a carbureted  Continental O-470-L or O-470-R piston engine, gross weight  and certified on 19 July 1963
182H Skylane
Four-seat light aircraft with fixed landing gear, powered by a carbureted  Continental O-470-R piston engine, gross weight  and certified on 17 September 1964
182J Skylane
Four-seat light aircraft with fixed landing gear, powered by a carbureted  Continental O-470-R piston engine, gross weight  and certified on 20 October 1965.
182K Skylane
Four-seat light aircraft with fixed landing gear, powered by a carbureted  Continental O-470-R piston engine, gross weight  and certified on 3 August 1966.
182L Skylane
Four-seat light aircraft with fixed landing gear, powered by a carbureted  Continental O-470-R piston engine, gross weight  and certified on 28 July 1967.
182M Skylane
Four-seat light aircraft with fixed landing gear, powered by a carbureted  Continental O-470-R piston engine, gross weight  and certified on 19 September 1968 An experimental version of this model had a full cantilever wing.
182N Skylane

Four-seat light aircraft with fixed landing gear, powered by a carbureted  Continental O-470-R or O-470-S piston engine, gross weight  and certified on 8 October 1971.
182Q Skylane
Four-seat light aircraft with fixed landing gear, powered by a carbureted  Continental O-470-U piston engine, gross weight  and certified on 28 July 1976 Significant changes were a change to a 24-V electrical system in model year 1978 at s/n 18265966 and a change from bladder to wet-wing fuel tanks in model year 1979 at s/n 18266591.
182R Skylane 
Certified on 29 August 1980. This variant, along with the 182Q, can alternatively be equipped with the jet fuel burning SMA SR305-230 Diesel engine.
182S Skylane
182T Skylane

Four-seat light aircraft with retractable landing gear, powered by a  Lycoming O-540-J3C5D piston engine, gross weight  and certified on 7 July 1977.
T182
T182T Skylane
It was produced from 2001 to 2013, with production forecast to commence again in 2023.
TR182 Turbo Skylane RG
Four-seat light aircraft with retractable landing gear, powered by a turbocharged  Lycoming O-540-L3C5D piston engine, gross weight  and certified on 12 September 1978.
T182JT-A Turbo Skylane JT-A
The model was first flown in May 2013, and as of July 2015, FAA certification is on hold indefinitely. Originally introduced as the Turbo Skylane NXT, Cessna changed the name to avoid confusion with the Remos NXT.
Robertson STOL 182
An aftermarket 182 STOL conversion certified in 1967 that changes the leading edge shape and aileron controls and lowers the stall speed below .

Operators

Civil users
The 182 is used by a multitude of civil operators, cadet organizations, and flight schools worldwide.

Government operators

Argentine Federal Police - one A182L from 2001 is still in service for training as of 2020.

 Federal Police

Transport Canada – one, sold in 2010

Civil Air Patrol – used for inland and coastal search and rescue, homeland security support, and airborne communications repeater service
Federal Bureau of Investigation - at least 27 used as surveillance aircraft equipped with optical, infrared and cellphone ELINT equipment

Military operators

Afghan Air Force

Army Aviation

Austrian Air Force - 2x Cessna 182 A/B

Belize Defence Force Air Wing

Canadian Army – 5 × L-182, retired 1970

Ecuadorian Army – 4

Air Force of El Salvador

Indonesian Air Force – 2x Cessna 182T

Mexican Air Force Received 73 during 1999–2000

United Arab Emirates Air Force

Uruguayan Air Force

Venezuelan Army
Venezuelan Air Force

Specifications (Cessna 182T)

See also

References

Bibliography

External links

Cessna Skylane manufacturer's website
Cessna 182 Skylane at Airliners.net
Details of most 182 models at PilotFriend.com
182 Model History – Cessna Pilots Association

182
High-wing aircraft
Single-engined tractor aircraft
1950s United States civil utility aircraft
Aircraft first flown in 1956
Glider tugs